The Battle of Britain Memorial is a monument to aircrew who flew in the Battle of Britain. It is sited on the White Cliffs at Capel-le-Ferne, near Folkestone, on the coast of Kent.

History
It was initiated by the Battle of Britain Memorial Trust, and opened by the Queen Mother on 9 July 1993. It is formed of a large propeller-shaped base, with the figure of a seated pilot carved by Harry Gray sitting at the centre. The propeller shape has led the monument to be considered a hill figure.

Also on the site are replicas of a Hawker Hurricane and Supermarine Spitfire and the Christopher Foxley-Norris Memorial Wall, on which appears the names of the almost 3,000 fighter aircrew who flew in the Battle.

In October 2010 The Duchess of Cornwall unveiled a bust of Air Chief Marshal Sir Keith Park by sculptor Will Davies at the site.

The Wing 
The new visitor centre, 'The Wing''' is an eye-catching design in the shape of a Spitfire wing, complete with dihedral angle.  Architects Godden Allen Lawn along with consulting engineers Crofton Consulting were appointed to undertake the building design with contractors Epps Construction undertaking the construction work.  The building was opened by Her Majesty the Queen on 26 March  2015 and won 'Project of the Year' at the 2016 Kent Design and Development awards.

Conceived as an experience rather than a museum the building contains The Scramble Experience; a'' central ‘cockpit’ area with an open balcony offering superb views across the Channel to France, from where the Luftwaffe would have appeared in 1940.  A high-tech screen is used to superimpose historical film of incoming German aircraft over the real view of the same scene.

References

External links
Battle of Britain Memorial - homepage
Harry Gray, Sculptor.  The Carving Workshop - Cambridge, UK
 On the 70th Anniversary of the Battle, a veteran at the Memorial recalls his memories http://www.bbc.co.uk/programmes/p00cbgt6 or if viewing outside the UK: http://vimeo.com/35312839

Britain Memorial, Capel-le-Ferne
Royal Air Force memorials
Britain Memorial, Capel-le-Ferne
British military memorials and cemeteries
Dover, Kent
Hill figures in England
Geoglyphs
Monuments and memorials in Kent
Cultural infrastructure completed in 1993
1993 sculptures